Bowker's Law Books and Serials in Print is a descriptive legal bibliography, and is one of the two main publications of this type. Law libraries often use it as an aid to collection development. It is a "standard reference work". It is "irresistible". It is complemented by International Legal Books in Print. It is published by R. R. Bowker.

References

Sources
Editions:La21_QklGBcC - digitized copies in snippet view from Google Books.
80 Law Library Journal 340.
Yirka, Carl. "Best Legal Reference Books" (1989) 81 Law Library Journal 305 at 309 and 328 and 329. 
Pagel, Scott B. "The Legal Bibliography and User Needs" (1989) 81 Law Library Journal 387 at 426.
Miller, Ellen J. "The Video Collection: Selection and Evaluation". 85 Law Library Journal 591 at 592.

Legal bibliographies